Hemandradenia chevalieri is a species of plant in the Connaraceae family. It is found in Ivory Coast and Ghana. It is threatened by habitat loss.

References

Connaraceae
Endangered plants
Taxonomy articles created by Polbot